The W-class trams are a family of electric trams built by the Melbourne & Metropolitan Tramways Board (MMTB) between 1923 and 1956. Over the 33 years of production, 752 vehicles spanning 12 sub-classes were constructed, the majority at the MMTB's Preston Workshops.

A small fleet continue to operate on the tramway network of Melbourne, Australia, where they are used on the City Circle tourist route. The W-class tram is a cultural icon to Melbourne: those that remain in the city are classified by the National Trust of Australia.

As well as Melbourne, W-class trams operate on tourist and heritage systems across the world. A number of older variants have been withdrawn from service and later sent to cities such as Copenhagen, San Francisco, Savannah and Seattle, and by private enthusiasts. In 2018, 134 W-class trams were offered to the Australian public for new uses.

As of December 2021, only 11 W class trams remain in service in Melbourne, all of which are W8 trams operating on the City Circle tram route.

History

W-class trams were introduced to Melbourne in 1923 as a new standard design. They had a dual bogie layout and were characterised by a substantial timber frame supplanted by a steel underframe, a simple rugged design, and fine craftsmanship (particularly the older models). The W class was the mainstay of Melbourne's tramways system for 60 years. A total of 752 trams of all variants were built.

The original variant (W) was a typical Drop-centre design tram, which was also used in Adelaide, Brisbane, Sydney, and later Bendigo, Ballarat and Geelong following movements of earlier Melbourne trams. The W1 was created with no centre doors, and changed to the W2 design, which all earlier Ws were upgraded to. A handful were upgraded to the SW2 design with sliding doors, which were followed by the unsuccessful W3 and W4 designs. All were supplemented in the late 1930s by 120 W5 (or "Clyde") class trams with wider cabins, and more powerful motors. However, they were notorious for being difficult to drive smoothly. After this came the SW5, initially only the last ten W5 trams fitted with sliding doors before entering service, but by the 1990s the majority of the W5 fleet, having been upgraded. The SW6 followed on, and became the most popular W-class tram with crews and passengers alike, because they were fast, smooth and comfortable, compared with earlier W variants. After experimentation with a PCC streetcar, construction of Ws resumed in 1951, with more SW6 and later W6 and the final 40 W-class trams (W7) emerging from Preston Workshops by 1956, when the need to provide something more capable of dealing with Olympic Games crowds than Bourke Street's buses prompted the last expansion of the network.

In April 1971, W7 1024 became the first tram to carry all over advertising livery when it was painted for the State Electricity Commission of Victoria, followed by Heinz (June 1971), Preston Market (August 1971), and Channel 0 (October 1971). It was fitted with 400 light bulbs on its roofline. It was joined by W6 900 in 1973. In 1977 W2 546 was fitted with an experimental Siemens pantograph.

The W7 class with its pneumatic sliding doors and softer suspension proved popular with passengers. It was not until the 1990s that the W class was finally considered surplus to rolling stock requirements. Mass withdrawal came with the introduction of the B2 class (although the previous Z and A classes had enabled withdrawal of W2s), with the remaining weather blind trams being removed by 1993, all of the 1980s SW5 conversions besides no.728 (which remained in service until 2011) by 1994, and many SW6/W6/W7 classes. In 1998, all Ws remaining in service were withdrawn due to a strike, and, although unintended, this would become the end for the Ws which were not running on routes 30,78/79 and 35. In 2014, all non-city circle Ws were withdrawn, in 2018, the restaurant trams, and in 2019, the remaining non-W8 class trams. This left only the upgraded sliding door W-class trams, modernised from 2013 onwards, which were designated the W8 class.

Removal from service 
In 1992, an official mass withdrawal of the W class was announced by transport minister Alan Brown. That was generally due to the fact that over 200 W class remained in service, while the newer Z-class trams were in storage in varying locations, after being displaced by the newer A and B class vehicles. Protests over the disappearing icons brought about a reconsideration of the withdrawal policy, and it was decided 53 Ws would be retained for tourist purposes. The popular zero-fare City Circle tourist route commenced in April 1994, using 12 of the 53 trams retained.

When the network was privatised in August 1999, 30 W-class trams were allocated to M>Tram and 23 to Yarra Trams.
In mid-2000 all operating W-class trams were removed from service following a series of incidents involving brake problems. Some returned to service in May 2001 on the City Circle route, with 25 operating in September 2003. The return of another 30 W-classes was announced in September 2003, but on more limited routes than before their withdrawal from service. All 53 had been returned to service by late 2003. The reintroduction followed the installation of new braking systems, speedometers, and the imposition of a 40 km/h speed limit. The trolley poles were subsequently replaced with pantographs.

The condition of the W-class fleet was criticised by the Australian Rail Tram & Bus Industry Union in September 2008, with a demand for the State Government to repair or withdraw them. A Yarra Trams spokesman said that the fleet met maintenance standards, but required more cosmetic work than other trams due to their wooden structure and age.

In January 2010, it was announced by transport minister Martin Pakula that the 26 W-class trams operating the inner city revenue services would be phased out by 2012, claiming that they were no longer suitable for revenue service and would be replaced by more modern trams. This prompted a new campaign from the National Trust of Australia to retain the W-class trams in service. It was also proposed that unused W-class trams could be better utilised by refurbishing and leasing them as "roving ambassadors" to other cities, with the claim that this could generate revenue for investment into the public transport system.

Heritage operations 
Following a change in government, in May 2011 $8 million over four years was allocated for the restoration of eight W-class trams, with options for new routes to be considered. The restoration is occurring at Preston Workshops (where many W-class trams were originally built), with the resultant tram being dubbed W8s, they are receiving full rebuilds and many upgrades, including modernised braking and suspension. The first, W8 946 entered service in March 2013, while the second, W8 959 returned from 18 months of work performed at Bendigo Tramways in June 2013. These have since been joined by W8 957 and W8 1010. As at February 2017, 981 and 983 were under overhaul in Bendigo.

As at March 2017, 12 W-class trams are in service on the Melbourne tram network, All run on the zero-fare City Circle tourist route at any time during operating hours. The last examples on routes 30, 78 and 79 were withdrawn in late 2013.

Three W6 class trams were converted for use on the Colonial Tramcar Restaurant service which operated three meal services daily. As of October 2018, Yarra Trams has declared the restaurant trams to be too unsafe for use on the network.

Today 
In October 2016, the government announced the formation of a reference group to formulate a strategy for the over 237 in store at Newport Workshops.

In 2018, the results of the condition audit were published as part of the Daniel Andrews State Government's Retired Trams Strategy. The audit found there was 237 W-class trams in storage in 2018, with most not in a suitable condition for tourist operations. Of the 237, 17 were operational for use on the City Circle line or the Colonial Tramcar Restaurant, 25 were in good overall condition and suitable for W8 upgrading, six were privately owned, 11 had historical significance, 20 were former Transporting Art trams, and 24 were of poor or incomplete condition but suitable for donors and spares. Trams with historical significance were to be kept and made available to museums, augmenting the 34 W-class trams already on display throughout Victoria. Five trams were kept for potential gifting and nine for other potential future uses. Former art trams were to be kept in storage for future public display.

The balance of trams, 134, had a condition or significance that did not lend itself to being preserved for operations in any way. These trams were offered to the public by the State Government under an expression of interest process, with trams offered for free to schools, community groups and non-profit organisations. Private buyers and business could purchase a tram for $1,000 plus the cost of transport, with owners having to explain how they would restore, repurpose and maintain the trams for use. A panel was established to assess applications, with priority given to maintaining public access. Trams were expected to be used for purposes like cafes or classrooms.

More than 1,500 applications were received through the process. The first two W-Class trams to leave Newport Workshop under the process were acquired by the City of Launceston in Tasmania in 2019 to be restored and used in a public space.

Preservation
The W-class tramcars are highly popular trams in preservation, both throughout Australia and around the world.

W-class trams were used in the filming of the HBO mini-series The Pacific, including W3-class tram number 667.

A number of W-class trams have been sent overseas, including five that were sold to Seattle between 1978 and 1993, where they operated as Seattle's own heritage streetcar line, George Benson Waterfront Streetcar Line, between 1982 and 2005. Since 1990, public outrage has forced an embargo to be placed on the sale of these trams to any overseas interest. Three of these trams have been sold to Loop Trolley for use in St. Louis.

In February 2004, after some years of negotiation, a W6-class tram, Melbourne 930, was shipped to Edmonton as an ambassador for the City of Melbourne.

The Dallas MATA and the Memphis MATA both run W-class trams on their downtown streetcar services. A highly modified W class tram began running in 2009 along River Street in Savannah, Georgia, its AC motors powered by biodiesel-fueled generators. Memphis MATA Trolley has 10 W-2 and 1 W-5 cars.

In the 1980s W2 520 was bought by the musician and composer Elton John in what he described as one of "my drug-induced moments". John exported the tram to England where it stands in the grounds of Woodside, his country house in Berkshire.

In 2005 W6 965 was restored at a cost of $25,000 and given as a wedding present from the Victorian Government to Princess Mary and Crown Prince Frederik of Denmark. Shipping line Maersk transported the tram to Denmark free of charge, waiving the estimated bill of $40,000. It was placed in the custody of the Skjoldenæsholm Tram Museum.

Subclasses

W
There were 200 W-class trams built from 1923 to 1926. They could seat 52 passengers with room for 93 people standing. They were built by the MMTB's Holden Street Workshop and Preston Workshops. Some were also built by private companies including James Moore & Sons of South Melbourne, and Holden Body Builders of Adelaide. All 200 were converted to W2s between 1928 and 1933. No. 380 was converted back to original condition in 1988 for the Heritage Fleet. No. 220 is undergoing conversion by the TMSV Bylands from W2 class back to the original W class tram.

W1
There were 30 W1-class trams built between 1925 and 1928. They were a variation on the W-class trams and used a different seating arrangement. The middle of the tram was open like the earlier cable cars and allowed passengers to get on and off the tram quickly. However, in cold and wet weather the openings were only covered by pull down blinds. Passengers were looking for more comfort and these trams were later converted to the W2 design. Four SW2s have been converted back to W1 in preservation.

W2/SW2

The W2-class was introduced in 1927 and remained in service until its final withdrawal in mid-1987.

The 406-strong class was the backbone of the MMTB's vast fleet during their heyday from the 1940s to 1960s. Most class members had been converted from the earlier W and W1-classes. The trams featured two enclosed saloon areas at either end of the tram and an open "drop-centre" section in the middle. A trademark feature of these vehicles until the 1970s was their uncomfortable wooden bench-style seats, a feature they shared with most other Melbourne trams of that period.

Mechanically, they had four under-floor motors powering two sets of the MMTB's "number one" bogies. The driver's controls were made by Westinghouse, Dick Kerr controllers, and Clyde Engineering controllers. The W2-class also had many variant gears within the tram bogies, the spur-geared W2 classes were notable due to their humming sound.

Two of the W2-class had their roller blind doors converted to sliding doors and were reclassed SW2. Four W1-class were converted directly to SW2-class.

Towards the end of their useful lives, many class members were converted to service (non-passenger) stock such as carborundum rail scrubbers, permanent-way vehicles, railgrinders and breakdown units. A large number of units were also sold to museums and public transport operators in Australia and around the world, with some still running today.

From 1978 until 1982 many W2s were painted by well-known Australian Artists as part of the "Transporting Art" program. In 1981 W2 442 was converted for use with the Colonial Tramcar Restaurant, entering service in November 1982. The last W2 to run in regular service in Melbourne ran in December 1987 on route 93 La Trobe Street to Bundoora, although a small number were used well into the early 1990s during extended tram shortages. No.442 was used by the Colonial Tramcar Restaurant until 2006 when it was withdrawn.

While the majority of W2 class trams were sold to private owners or overseas, 26 W2 and 5 SW2 class trams are preserved by heritage tramways in Australia and New Zealand.

W3

The W3-class trams were built between 1930 and 1934. These were the first trams to use an all steel frame. There were 16 trams built at Preston Workshops. They were built from parts and equipment which had been intended for building Y1-class trams. They had larger wheels, 33 inches in diameter, which were designed to provide a smoother and quieter ride. These wheels came from scrapped S and T class trams. These larger wheels made the tram body sit higher, and the floors in the drop centre were ramped to reduce the step into the saloon.

During the 1960s the trams developed cracks in the frame which held the motors and all were withdrawn from service by 1969.

Four W3 trams (661, 663, 667, 668) are preserved by heritage organisations. Preserved car W3 661 was damaged in an accident involving a motor vehicle on 10 March 2019 in Ballarat. The damage from the accident means that the tram requires extensive repairs to the frame and body.

W4

There were five W4-class trams built between 1933 and 1935. They had a wider body and lower floor than the W3, and had transverse seating in the saloon. They were all withdrawn by 1968. The wider body of the tram meant the drivers found it difficult to see the steps.

Four W4 trams (670, 671, 673 and 674) are preserved by heritage tramways in Australia.

CW5/W5/SW5

Five CW5-class trams, numbered 681 to 685, were built at the Preston Workshops in 1934/35. They had wider bodies, based on the previous W4-class, but utilised electrical equipment recovered from scrapped Maximum Traction C class trams (hence the "C" prefix). They were the only W-class trams with only 2 motors (instead of 4), and were not considered successful. Fleet numbers 686 to 719 were reserved for 34 more of the type using equipment from the remaining C-class trams, but no more were constructed, and all CW5s were converted to standard W5-class trams in 1956.

In 1935, the first of 120 W5-class trams entered service, with the same body as  a CW5-class tram, but were equipped with equal-wheel, 4-motor bogies based on those used on the W3- and W4-class trams. Production continued until 1939 and included five CW5-class trams under construction being converted before release to traffic. Many of these W5-class trams were allocated to Essendon and (the new) Brunswick depots as a result of the mid-1930s conversion of the Elizabeth Street cable trams to electric traction. Most cars numbered above 800 had "swept corner" windscreens. From the early 1970s, many cars had their little-used, narrow centre doorways panelled-over, and most had their original windshields replaced with SW6-class types, which had "swept corners" with half-drop side windows, but not all of them received the deeper fascia.

During construction in 1939, the last ten W5-class trams were modified with sliding doors, like as the first of the SW6-class trams which was being built at the same time. They also had metal-framed, full-drop saloon windows with quarter lights. In 1956, W5-class trams 785 and 787 were converted to SW5-class (type 2), following accident damage. Parts from the cancelled order for more W7-class trams were used in the repairs, and the two cars featured half-drop saloon windows, with quarter lights.

An additional 83 W5-class trams were converted to SW5-class (type 3) trams between 1983 and 1986. They were fitted with aluminium sliding doors, but retained their original wooden-framed, full-drop windows.

Apart from those severely damaged in accidents, the first W5 was withdrawn in 1987, and the last in 1994. During the mass withdrawal of W-class trams in 1994–96, the majority of SW5-class trams were retired in preference to the higher numbered trams, ostensibly due to the discovery of asbestos in the controllers.

As of January 2020, there were no SW5 or W5 trams remaining in service, with the majority stored. However, nine W5 and three SW5 trams are preserved with heritage tramways in Australia and New Zealand, including a fully restored W5, number 774, on display at Hawthorn Depot.

Fleet numbers
CW5 converted to W5: 681 – 685
Built as W5: 720 – 839
Built as SW5: 840 – 849
W5 converted to SW5: 681 – 682, 721 – 734, 736 – 750, 752 – 755, 757 – 760, 764 – 765, 767 – 770, 773, 775 – 777, 780 – 781, 784 – 791, 793, 796 – 797, 800, 802, 805 – 812, 814 – 816, 818 – 819, 824, 828 – 830, 834, 836 – 838

W6/SW6

The SW6-class were introduced in 1939 and were followed by the W6-class which were produced between 1951 and 1955, 150 were built in total. At their introduction, W6-class trams were popular with passengers and crew alike for being fast, smooth and comfortable. The cab controls are the same as of other W-class trams. The first 40 had flip-over wooden seats in the end saloons, the remainder having upholstered bus seats. All had wooden seats in the centre saloon until the 1970s when the entire class was refurbished with upholstered seats throughout.

W6-class trams initially begun as a sub group of the SW6-class trams, but later became their own class. The W6 differed from the SW6 in having quieter wheels and gears plus additional soundproofing.

As of June 2020, no trams are operational in original condition with Yarra Trams, with all of them being converted into W8 trams or stored. Two W6 and twelve SW6 trams are in the hands of preservation groups, one of which is used as a café tram in Bendigo. Three SW6-class trams also operate on the Colonial Tramcar Restaurant service.

W7
Forty W7-class trams were built in 1955/56 for operation on new Bourke Street routes (routes 86 and 96). Originally 70 were ordered but the number was cut to 40 following a change of government at the 1955 state election. They were very similar to the preceding W6-class, but with upholstered seats throughout. Thirteen had their frames built by Ansair. As of January 2020, none remained in service with Yarra Trams. Six W7 class trams are preserved by heritage groups in Australia and New Zealand.

W8

SW6 922 was partly modernised at Preston Workshops in 1993. It was to be a prototype for rebuilding the remaining SW6 fleet with air conditioning, roller bearings, modern head and tail lights, fluorescent interior lighting, dot-matrix display and pantograph using many of the same components as used in the A2 and B2 class trams. It was designated the W8 class and renumbered 1101. The rebuild radically altered the appearance of the tram and the National Trust ordered the conversion be suspended before completion.

Four (946, 957, 959 and 1010) were subsequently modernised from 2012 and designated the W8-class. The upgrades include improved traction motors, suspension and braking, improved crashworthiness and LED lighting, while retaining the general appearance of the original SW6 and W7s.

Since 2018, W8 trams are the only W classes to have current safety accreditation to run on YarraTram's network.

Currently, there are 13 W8 trams in service, along with one stored after several days of operation, and several currently under conversion. About 25 older W class trams are stored by YarraTrams, awaiting future W8 conversion.

Class Summaries

List of preserved W-class trams

Preservation groups

Other preserved

Overseas

References

External links

List of Melbourne trams at Vicsig, including all varieties of W class
Flickr gallery
Flickr gallery

Melbourne tram vehicles
600 V DC multiple units